Vankhama (1906-1970) was a traditional writer, composer and poet from Mizoram, India. He is known in Mizo literature for a unique lyrical style. He composed over 50 song. Among his famous works are Tlaizawng Par, Nunrawng Hmelṭha, Rimawi Ram and Mizo Vaihlo. He received much of his musical training from the British Christian missionaries in Mizoram.

Personal
He was born in Diarkhai village. His father was the first Mizo pastor Vanchhunga. He studied in various places including Shillong, Silchar and Calcutta (now Kolkata). He is also father of two well known mizo singers Vanhlupuii and Vanlalruati.

Songs
Vankhama was the first Mizo Musician who brought the violin and Hawaiian Guitar from Kolkata in 1926, soon local craftsman started making guitars locally.
Some of his more famous works are:
Khawngai Hnuchham
Rimawi Ram
Mizo Vaihlo
Nunrawng Hmelṭha

References 

Scholars from Mizoram
Mizo people
Indian male writers
Writers from Mizoram
1906 births
1970 deaths